Gurdwara Toka Sahib is an historical Sikh shrine located at Toka village, near Naraingarh in Haryana.  In 1688, Guru Gobind Singh visited this area from his way from Paunta Sahib to Anandpur Sahib. Lieutenant Fateh Singh served as president of place for 13 years.

References

Gurdwaras in Haryana